The Victoria River is a tributary of the Exploits River in western Newfoundland, Canada.

The Victoria River flows eastward from the Long Range Mountains to join the Exploits River at Red Indian Lake. It is 137 km in length.
<mapframe
text="Mouth of the Victoria River"
width=250 	
height=250	
zoom=10
latitude=48.743056
longitude=-56.678889/>

See also
List of rivers of Newfoundland and Labrador

Rivers of Newfoundland and Labrador